The  is a limited express train service in Japan operated by East Japan Railway Company (JR East), which runs from  to  and  via the Tōhoku Main Line and Ōu Main Line.

Service pattern

Rolling stock
Services are normally formed of 4-car E751 series electric multiple units (EMUs) based at Aomori depot, with Aomori-based 4-car 485-3000 series EMUs also used on some additional services during busy seasons.

Formations
Trains are formed as shown below, with car 1 at the Akita end. All cars are no-smoking.

History
From 19 November 1956, the train was rerouted to run via  and Akita. This service was discontinued from the start of the revised timetable on 1 December 1993.

Services were formed of 6-car 485-3000 series and E751 series EMUs based at Aomori depot, with JR Hokkaido 789 series EMUs used on some services.

From this date, services were formed of shortened 4-car 485-3000 series EMUs, with the E751 series EMUs temporarily removed from service.

From 23 April 2011, the E751 series sets were reinstated on Tsugaru services, this time formed as 4-car sets, replacing the 485-3000 series sets.

References

External links

 JR East 485 series Tsugaru 
 JR East E751 series Tsugaru 

Named passenger trains of Japan
East Japan Railway Company
Railway services introduced in 1954
1954 establishments in Japan